Small Dog Electronics is an American consumer electronics and information technology consulting business based in Burlington, Vermont. Founded and operated by Don Mayer, the business has grown from a small computer repair and reselling business into an Apple Premier Partner and manufacturer of iPod accessories like speakers and headphones. Most of the firm's employees bring their pet dogs to work each day.

In November 2019, Small Dog Electronics closed its original Waitsfield location, moving to a new location in Burlington, Vermont.

References

Apple Specialists
Companies based in Vermont
Consumer electronics retailers in the United States
Privately held companies based in Vermont
Dogs in popular culture
Electronics companies established in 1994
1994 establishments in Vermont
American companies established in 1994
Retail companies established in 1994